Higher University of San Andrés (Universidad Mayor de San Andrés or UMSA or Major University of San Andrés) is the leading public university in Bolivia, established since 1830 in the city of La Paz. UMSA is the second-oldest university in Bolivia, after the University of San Francisco Xavier de Chuquisaca (1624).

It is one of the most prestigious higher academic centers in the country. As of 2013, UMSA had around 80,434 registered students, making it the university with the largest student body in Bolivia. Several presidents of Bolivia have studied at the university.

In 2017, the QS Latin American University Rankings placed UMSA as the best Bolivian university and in the position 91 of the Latin American Universities.

History
The university was founded by Andrés de Santa Cruz by Supreme Decree on 25 October 1830. Owing to its being situated in the nation's seat of government, La Paz, the Higher University of San Andrés has since its founding influenced the social life and history of Bolivia. The university's history consists of three well-defined periods. From its inception in 1830 until a June 1930 revolution the university was official. From 1930 to the 1936 advent of the University Rectorate, position filled by Héctor Ormachea Zalles, the university was a semi-autonomous or municipal university. From then until the present, the university has been autonomous.

Headquarters
The building that now hosts the university's main offices, known as Monoblock, is located on Avenue Villazón. It was designed in 1942 by architect Emilio Villanueva and is considered an iconic example of Bolivian architecture. The building is part of a university complex inspired by Pre-Columbian architecture that never fully materialized. Construction started in 1942 and concluded on 4 July 1947. It was criticized for being the first skyscraper in the city.

It is also an epicenter of social movements and many congregate there after marching downtown.

It has 13 floors, 11 of which are used for classrooms. It contains the most complete library in the country, an auditorium that is open to the public for various events, and a semi-subterranean garden with access to the central atrium. The library was created in 1930.

Due to the high demand for rooms, various pavilions and two buildings were built in the surrounding areas. They are separated from Monoblock by open areas and the remnants of the military college, also designed by Villanueva.

Colleges
The university has the following colleges
Law and Political Sciences
Medicine website
Architecture, Arts, Design, and Planning website
Social Sciences website
Economics and Finance
Humanities and Education website
Pharmaceutical and Biochemical Sciences website
Engineering website
Mechanics
Pure and Natural Sciences website (which maintains the Max Schreier Planetarium and the Astronomical Observatory of Patacamaya)
Dentistry
Agronomy
Earth Sciences

Notable alumni
Ana Teresa Morales, economist, professor, and politician
Eduardo del Castillo, lawyer and politician

Doctor honoris causa
 Gregorio Baro, Argentine scientist
 Jaime Escalante, Educator
 Eduardo Bayro, Bolivian scientist, expert in geometric algebra
 Takaaki Kajita, Nobel Prize in Physics 2015

References

External links

 Official page of the Higher University of San Andrés
 List of colleges and majors
 Central Library

Universities in Bolivia
Educational institutions established in 1830
Schools in La Paz
Buildings and structures in La Paz Department (Bolivia)
1830 establishments in Bolivia